Nagakannika is a 1949 Indian Kannada film directed by G. Vishwanathan. The film stars Prathima Devi, M. Jayashree and G. W. Sandow in lead roles. It was the first folk-based film in Kannada. The film was successful at the box office.

Cast
 M. Jayashree
 Pratima Devi
 G. W. Sandow
 Bellary Ratnamala

References

External links
 

1949 films
Indian black-and-white films
1940s Kannada-language films